Lincoln is an unincorporated community in Jackson County, Oregon, United States. It lies along Oregon Route 66 (Greens Springs Highway) between Ashland and Klamath Falls in the Siskiyou Mountains near Pinehurst. It is within the boundaries of the Cascade–Siskiyou National Monument.

Oregon Geographic Names, citing an article in the Medford Mail-Tribune of September 29, 1929, says that Lincoln was named for Lincoln, New Hampshire, by a family whose surname was Henry. The family, formerly operating in New England, owned a lumber mill in Lincoln.

References

Unincorporated communities in Jackson County, Oregon
Unincorporated communities in Oregon